NGC 1015 is a barred spiral galaxy, at a distance of 118 million light years in the constellation of Cetus (The Whale).

The galaxy is host to SN 2009ig, a typical type 1a supernova.

See also 
 Spiral Galaxy

References

External links 
 
NGC 1015 on SIMBAD

1015
Cetus (constellation)
Barred spiral galaxies
009988